The 2022 Tampa Bay Rays season was the 25th season of the Tampa Bay Rays franchise and their 15th as the Rays. The Rays played their home games at Tropicana Field as members of Major League Baseball's American League East Division.

On December 2, 2021, Commissioner of Baseball Rob Manfred announced a lockout of players, following expiration of the collective bargaining agreement (CBA) between the league and the Major League Baseball Players Association (MLBPA). On March 10, 2022, the MLB and MLBPA agreed to a new collective bargaining agreement, thus ending the lockout. Opening Day was played on April 7. Although MLB previously announced that several series would be canceled due to the lockout, the agreement provided for a 162-game season, with originally canceled games to be made up via doubleheaders.

The Rays finished in third place in their division, qualifying for the playoffs as the final wild card in the American League. They lost to the Cleveland Guardians in a two-game sweep in the Wild Card Series.

Offseason

Lockout 

The expiration of the league's collective bargaining agreement (CBA) with the Major League Baseball Players Association occurred on December 1, 2021 with no new agreement in place. As a result, the team owners voted unanimously to lockout the players stopping all free agency and trades. 

The parties came to an agreement on a new CBA on March 10, 2022.

Rule changes 
Pursuant to the new CBA, several new rules were instituted for the 2022 season. The National League will adopt the designated hitter full-time, a draft lottery will be implemented, the postseason will expand from ten teams to twelve, and advertising patches will appear on player uniforms and helmets for the first time.

Season standings

American League East

American League Wild Card

Game Log

Regular season

|- style="background:#bfb;"
| 1 || April 8 || Orioles || 2–1 || Kittredge (1–0) || López (0–1) || Raley (1) || 25,025 || 1–0 || W1
|- style="background:#bfb;"
| 2 || April 9 || Orioles || 5–3 || Fleming (1–0) || Lyles (0–1) || Kittredge (1) || 15,615 || 2–0 || W2
|- style="background:#bfb;"
| 3 || April 10 || Orioles || 8–0 || Springs (1–0) || Wells (0–1) || — || 14,100 || 3–0 || W3
|- style="background:#fbb;"
| 4 || April 11 || Athletics || 2–13 || Blackburn (1–0) || Patiño (0–1) || — || 9,139 || 3–1 || L1
|- style="background:#bfb;"
| 5 || April 12 || Athletics || 9–8  || Thompson (1–0) || Trivino (0–1) || — || 7,588 || 4–1 || W1
|- style="background:#fbb;"
| 6 || April 13 || Athletics || 2–4 || Montas (1–1) || McClanahan (0–1) || Trivino (1) || 8,954 || 4–2 || L1
|- style="background:#fbb;"
| 7 || April 14 || Athletics || 3–6 || Irvin (1–1) || Fleming (1–1) || Jiménez (1) || 8,287 || 4–3 || L2
|- style="background:#fbb;"
| 8 || April 15 || @ White Sox || 2–3 || Cease (2–0) || Rasmussen (0–1) || Hendriks (3) || 19,009 || 4–4 || L3
|- style="background:#fbb;"
| 9 || April 16 || @ White Sox || 2–3 || López (2–0) || Thompson (1–1) || Hendriks (4) || 27,113 || 4–5 || L4
|- style="background:#bfb;"
| 10 || April 17 || @ White Sox || 9–3 || Mazza (1–0) || Velasquez (0–1) || — || 17,798 || 5–5 || W1
|- style="background:#fbb;"
| 11 || April 18 || @ Cubs || 2–4 || Thompson (2–0) || Adam (0–1) || Robertson (4) || 26,615 || 5–6 || L1
|- style="background:#bfb;" 
| 12 || April 19 || @ Cubs || 6–5 || Fleming (2–1) || Steele (1–1) || Kittredge (2) || 26,568 || 6–6 || W1
|- style="background:#bfb;"
| 13 || April 20 || @ Cubs || 8–2  || Beeks (1–0) || Stroman (0–2) || — || 26,167 || 7–6 || W2
|- style="background:#fbb;" 
| 14 || April 22 || Red Sox || 3–4 || Wacha (1–0) || Kluber (0–1) || Barnes (1) || 16,902 || 7–7 || L1
|- style="background:#bfb;" 
| 15 || April 23 || Red Sox || 3–2  || Wisler (1–0) || Robles (1–1) || — || 19,137 || 8–7 || W1
|- style="background:#bfb;" 
| 16 || April 24 || Red Sox || 5–2 || McClanahan (1–1) || Valdéz (0–1) || Thompson (1) || 20,993 || 9–7 || W2
|- style="background:#fbb;" 
| 17 || April 26 || Mariners || 4–8 || Gilbert (3–0) || Fleming (2–2) || — || 9,257 || 9–8 || L1
|- style="background:#bfb;"
| 18 || April 27 || Mariners || 3–2 || Rasmussen (1–1) || Gonzales (1–2) || Kittredge (3) || 7,290 || 10–8 || W1
|- style="background:#bfb;"
| 19 || April 28 || Mariners || 2–1 || Feyereisen (1–0) || Flexen (1–3) || Thompson (2) || 6,749 || 11–8 || W2
|- style="background:#bfb;"
| 20 || April 29 || Twins || 6–1 || Kluber (1–1) || Bundy (3–1) || — || 9,928 || 12–8 || W3
|- style="background:#fbb;" 
| 21 || April 30 || Twins || 1–9 || Stashak (2–0) || McClanahan (1–2) || — || 18,846 || 12–9 || L1
|-

|- style="background:#fbb;" 
| 22 || May 1 || Twins || 3–9 || Winder (1–0) || Fleming (2–3) || — || 14,830 || 12–10 || L2
|- style="background:#bfb;" 
| 23 || May 2 || @ Athletics || 6–1 || Rasmussen (2–1) || Jefferies (1–4) || — || 2,488 || 13–10 || W1
|- style="background:#bfb;" 
| 24 || May 3 || @ Athletics || 10–7  || Kittredge (2–0) || Trivino (0–2) || — || 2,815 || 14–10 || W2
|- style="background:#bfb;" 
| 25 || May 4 || @ Athletics || 3–0 || Feyereisen (2–0) || Jackson (0–1) || Kittredge (4) || 4,838 || 15–10 || W3
|- style="background:#bfb;"
| 26 || May 5 || @ Mariners || 4–3 || McClanahan (2–2) || Ray (2–3) || Raley (2) || 17,027 || 16–10 || W4
|- style="background:#bfb;" 
| 27 || May 6 || @ Mariners || 8–7 || Thompson (2–1) || Sewald (0–1) || Raley (3) || 26,154 || 17–10 || W5
|- style="background:#bfb;"  
| 28 || May 7 || @ Mariners || 8–2 || Rasmussen (3–1) || Gonzales (1–4) || — || 31,589 || 18–10 || W6
|- style="background:#fbb;"
| 29 || May 8 || @ Mariners || 1–2  || Sewald (1–1) || Wisler (1–1) || — || 32,501 || 18–11 || L1
|- style="background:#fbb;" 
| 30 || May 9 || @ Angels || 3–11 || Syndergaard (3–1) || Springs (1–1) || — || 19,537 || 18–12 || L2
|- style="background:#fbb;" 
| 31 || May 10 || @ Angels || 0–12 || Detmers (2–1) || Kluber (1–2) || — || 39,313 || 18–13 || L3
|- style="background:#bfb;" 
| 32 || May 11 || @ Angels || 4–2  || Feyereisen (3–0) || Loup (0–2) || Raley (4) || 21,045 || 19–13 || W1
|- style="background:#bfb;" 
| 33 || May 13 || Blue Jays || 5–2 || Kittredge (3–0) || Gausman (3–2) || Adam (1) || 10,169 || 20–13 || W2
|- style="background:#fbb;" 
| 34 || May 14 || Blue Jays || 1–5 || Mayza (2–0) || Thompson (1–2) || — || 15,195 || 20–14 || L1
|- style="background:#bfb;"
| 35 || May 15 || Blue Jays || 3–0 || Wisler (2–1) || Manoah (4–1) || Kittredge (5) || 20,832 || 21–14 || W1
|- style="background:#fbb;"
| 36 || May 16 || Tigers || 2–3 || Fulmer (2–2) || Kittredge (3–1) || Soto (6) || 11,532 || 21–15 || L1
|- style="background:#bfb;" 
| 37 || May 17 || Tigers || 8–1 || McClanahan (3–2) || Brieske (0–3) || — || 8,475 || 22–15 || W1
|- style="background:#bfb;"
| 38 || May 18 || Tigers || 6–1 || Rasmussen (4–1) || Rodríguez (1–3) || — || 9,706 || 23–15 || W2
|- style="background:#fbb;"
| 39 || May 20 || @ Orioles || 6–8  || Vespi (1–0) || Garza Jr. (0–1) || — || 15,127 || 23–16 || L1
|- style="background:#bfb;" 
| 40 || May 21 || @ Orioles || 6–1 || Springs (2–1) || Bradish (1–3) || — || 17,573 || 24–16 || W1
|- style="background:#fbb;" 
| 41 || May 22 || @ Orioles || 6–7  || Pérez (2–0) || Knight (0–1) || — || 23,778 || 24–17 || L1
|- style="background:#bfb;" 
| 42 || May 24 || Marlins || 4–0 || McClanahan (4–2) || López (4–2) || — || 9,006 || 25–17 || W1
|- style="background:#bfb;" 
| 43 || May 25 || Marlins || 5–4 || Rasmussen (5–1) || Poteet (0–1) || Poche (1) || 7,520 || 26–17 || W2
|- style="background:#fbb;" 
| 44 || May 26 || Yankees || 2–7 || Cortés Jr. (4–1) || Yarbrough (0–1) || — || 14,610 || 26–18 || L1
|- style="background:#fbb;" 
| 45 || May 27 || Yankees || 0–2 || Taillon (5–1) || Springs (2–2) || Holmes (6) || 19,018 || 26–19 || L2
|- style="background:#bfb;" 
| 46 || May 28 || Yankees || 3–1 || Feyereisen (4–0) || Luetge (1–2) || Poche  (2) || 25,025 || 27–19 || W1
|- style="background:#bfb;" 
| 47 || May 29 || Yankees || 4–2 || McClanahan (5–2) || Severino (3–1) || Feyereisen (1) || 25,025 || 28–19 || W2
|- style="background:#fbb;" 
| 48 || May 30 || @ Rangers || 5–9 || Otto (3–2) || Rasmussen (5–2) || — || 25,605 || 28–20 || L1
|- style="background:#fbb;" 
| 49 || May 31 || @ Rangers || 0–3 || Pérez (4–2) || Yarbrough (0–2) || Barlow (9) || 16,317 || 28–21 || L2
|-

|- style="background:#bfb;" 
| 50 || June 1 || @ Rangers || 4–3  || Poche (1–0) || Santana (2–2) || Wisler (1) || 20,634 || 29–21 || W1
|- style="background:#bfb;" 
| 51 || June 2 || @ Rangers || 3–1 || Kluber (2–2) || Hearn (3–4) || Thompson (3) || 17,097 || 30–21 || W2
|- style="background:#bfb;" 
| 52 || June 3 || White Sox || 6–3 || McClanahan (6–2) || Martin (0–2) || Poche  (3) || 8,930 || 31–21 || W3
|- style="background:#fbb;" 
| 53 || June 4 || White Sox || 2–3 || Crick (2–0) || Beeks (1–1) || Hendriks (15) || 19,452 || 31–22 || L1
|- style="background:#fbb;" 
| 54 || June 5 || White Sox || 5–6 || Giolito (4–2) || Yarbrough (0–3) || Hendriks (16) || 11,162 || 31–23 || L2
|- style="background:#bfb;" 
| 55 || June 7 || Cardinals || 4–2  || Poche (2–0) || VerHagen (3–1) || — || 10,905 || 32–23 || W1
|- style="background:#bfb;"
| 56 || June 8 || Cardinals || 11–3 || Kluber (3–2) || Naughton (0–2) || — || 12,906 || 33–23 || W2
|- style="background:#bfb;"
| 57 || June 9 || Cardinals || 2–1 || McClanahan (7–2) || Mikolas (4–4) || Adam (2) || 14,892 || 34–23 || W3
|- style="background:#fbb;"
| 58 || June 10 || @ Twins || 4–9 || Smeltzer (3–0) || Rasmussen (5–3) || — || 23,761 || 34–24 || L1
|- style="background:#fbb;" 
| 59 || June 11 || @ Twins || 5–6 || Megill (2–1) || Baz (0–1) || Pagán (8) || 22,741 || 34–25 || L2
|- style="background:#bfb;"
| 60 || June 12 || @ Twins || 6–0 || Springs (3–2) || Sands (0–3) || — || 25,350 || 35–25 || W1
|- style="background:#fbb;"
| 61 || June 14 || @ Yankees || 0–2 || Cole (6–1) || Kluber (3–3) || Holmes (10) || 35,692 || 35–26 || L1
|- style="background:#fbb;" 
| 62 || June 15 || @ Yankees || 3–4 || Cortés Jr. (6–2) || McClanahan (7–3) || Holmes (11) || 35,104 || 35–27 || L2
|- style="background:#fbb;" 
| 63 || June 16 || @ Yankees || 1–2 || King (4–1) || Armstrong (0–1) || — || 39,469 || 35–28 || L3
|- style="background:#fbb;" 
| 64 || June 17 || @ Orioles || 0–1 || Bautista (3–2) || Faucher (0–1) || López (10) || 13,140 || 35–29 || L4
|- style="background:#bfb;" 
| 65 || June 18 || @ Orioles || 7–6 || Faucher (1–1) || Tate (0–3) || Poche (4) || 15,426 || 36–29 || W1
|- style="background:#fbb;" 
| 66 || June 19 || @ Orioles || 1–2 || Vespi (2–0) || Kluber (3–4) || López (11) || 23,004 || 36–30 || L1
|- style="background:#fbb;" 
| 67 || June 20 || Yankees || 2–4 || Holmes (5–0) || Adam (0–2) || Peralta (2) || 16,504 || 36–31 || L2
|- style="background:#bfb;"
| 68 || June 21 || Yankees || 5–4 || Armstrong (1–1) || Cortés Jr. (6–3) || Poche (5) || 20,688 || 37–31 || W1
|- style="background:#fbb;" 
| 69 || June 22 || Yankees || 4–5 || Schmidt (4–2) || Garza Jr. (0–2) || Holmes (12) || 12,264 || 37–32 || L1
|- style="background:#bfb;" 
| 70 || June 24 || Pirates || 4–3  || Adam (1–2) || De Los Santos (0–1) || — || 10,542 || 38–32 || W1
|- style="background:#bfb;" 
| 71 || June 25 || Pirates || 6–5 || Garza Jr. (1–2) || Bednar (3–2) || — || 15,203 || 39–32 || W2
|- style="background:#bfb;"
| 72 || June 26 || Pirates || 4–2 || McClanahan (8–3) || Beede (0–1) || Raley (4) || 13,364 || 40–32 || W3
|- style="background:#fbb;" 
| 73 || June 28 || Brewers || 3–5 || Woodruff (6–3) || Wisler (2–2) || Hader (23) || 13,742 || 40–33 || L1
|- style="background:#fbb;" 
| 74 || June 29 || Brewers || 3–5 || Boxberger (2–1) || Faucher (1–2) || Hader (24) || 15,481 || 40–34 || L2
|- style="background:#fbb;" 
| 75 || June 30 || @ Blue Jays || 1–4 || Kikuchi (3–4) || Yarbrough (0–4) || Cimber (4) || 22,987 || 40–35 || L3
|-

|- style="background:#fbb;"
| 76 || July 1 || @ Blue Jays || 2–9 || Berríos (6–4) || Kluber (3–5) || — || 44,445 || 40–36 || L4
|- style="background:#bfb;" 
| 77 || July 2  || @ Blue Jays || 6–2 || McClanahan (9–3) || Lawrence (0–1) || — || 39,426 || 41–36 || W1
|- style="background:#bfb;" 
| 78 || July 2  || @ Blue Jays || 11–5 || Garza Jr. (2–2) || Hatch (0–1) || — || 24,180 || 42–36 || W2
|- style="background:#bfb;" 
| 79 || July 3 || @ Blue Jays || 7–3 || Baz (1–1) || Stripling (4–3) || Adam (3) || 35,757 || 43–36 || W3
|- style="background:#fbb;" 
| 80 || July 4 || @ Red Sox || 0–4 || Crawford (2–2) || Fleming (2–4) || Schreiber (3) || 36,473 || 43–37 || L1
|- style="background:#bfb;"
| 81 || July 5 || @ Red Sox || 8–4 || Thompson (2–2) || Pivetta (8–6) || — || 31,113 || 44–37 || W1
|- style="background:#bfb;" 
| 82 || July 6 || @ Red Sox || 7–1 || Kluber (4–5) || Bello (0–1) || — || 33,735 || 45–37 || W2
|- style="background:#fbb;"
| 83 || July 8 || @ Reds || 1–2  || Kuhnel (1–1) || Wisler (2–3) || — || 26,529 || 45–38 || L1
|- style="background:#fbb;"
| 84 || July 9 || @ Reds || 4–5  || Hoffman (2–0) || Faucher (1–3) || — || 33,927 || 45–39 || L2
|- style="background:#fbb;"
| 85 || July 10 || @ Reds || 5–10 || Lodolo (2–2) || Baz (1–2) || — || 21,748 || 45–40 || L3
|- style="background:#bfb;"
| 86 || July 11 || Red Sox || 10–5 || Bard (1–0) || Diekman (4–1) || — || 10,629 || 46–40 || W1
|- style="background:#bfb;"
| 87 || July 12 || Red Sox || 3–2 || Kluber (5–5) || Strahm (3–3) || Raley (5) || 10,653 || 47–40 || W2
|- style="background:#bfb;"
| 88 || July 13 || Red Sox || 4–1 || McClanahan (10–3) || Winckowski (3–4) || Poche (6) || 10,548 || 48–40 || W3
|- style="background:#bfb;"
| 89 || July 14 || Red Sox || 5–4 || Romero (1–0) || Schreiber (2–1) || Beeks (1) || 11,998 || 49–40 || W4
|- style="background:#bfb;"
| 90 || July 15 || Orioles || 5–4 || Wisler (3–3) || Wells (7–5) || Raley (6) || 13,917 || 50–40 || W5
|- style="background:#fbb;"
| 91 || July 16 || Orioles || 4–6  || López (4–5) || Bard (1–1) || Krehbiel (1) || 19,886 || 50–41 || L1
|- style="background:#bfb;"
| 92 || July 17 || Orioles || 7–5 || Kluber (6–5) || Lyles (6–8) || Adam (4) || 13,813 || 51–41 || W1
|- style="text-align:center; background:#bbcaff;"
| colspan="10" | 92nd All-Star Game in Los Angeles
|- style="background:#bfb;"
| 93 || July 22 || @ Royals || 7–3 || Rasmussen (6–3) || Keller (5–10) || — || 22,102 || 52–41 || W2
|- style="background:#fbb;"
| 94 || July 23 || @ Royals || 3–6 || Barlow (4–2) || Yarbrough (0–5) || — || 20,668 || 52–42 || L1
|- style="background:#fbb;"
| 95 || July 24 || @ Royals || 2–4 || Bubic (2–6) || Raley (1–1) || Clarke (2) || 12,336 || 52–43 || L2
|- style="background:#fbb;"
| 96 || July 25 || @ Orioles || 1–5 || Vespi (3–0) || Kluber (6–6) || — || 9,606 || 52–44 || L3
|- style="background:#fbb;"
| 97 || July 26 || @ Orioles || 3–5 || Akin (2–1) || Poche (2–1) || López (19) || 11,307 || 52–45 || L4
|- style="background:#bfb;" 
| 98 || July 27 || @ Orioles || 6–4  || Poche (3–1) || López (4–6) || Fairbanks (1) || 13,592 || 53–45 || W1
|- style="background:#fbb;"
| 99 || July 28 || @ Orioles || 0–3 || Lyles (7–8) || Yarbrough (0–6) || Bautista (3) || 16,784 || 53–46 || L1
|- style="background:#fbb;"
| 100 || July 29 || Guardians || 1–4 || Bieber (5–6) || Springs (3–3) || Clase (22) || 14,671 || 53–47 || L2
|- style="background:#bfb;"
| 101 || July 30 || Guardians || 6–4 || Kluber (7–6) || Plesac (2–9) || Fairbanks (2) || 22,756 || 54–47 || W1
|- style="background:#fbb;"
| 102 || July 31 || Guardians || 3–5 || McCarty (2–2) || McClanahan (10–4) || Clase (23) || 18,023 || 54–48 || L1
|-

|- style="background:#fbb;"
| 103 || August 2 || Blue Jays || 1–3 || Gausman (8–8) || Rasmussen (6–4) || Romano (25) || 16,433 || 54–49 || L2
|- style="background:#bfb;"
| 104 || August 3 || Blue Jays || 3–2 || Thompson (3–2) || Cimber (8–4) || Adam (5) || 14,253 || 55–49 || W1
|- style="background:#bfb;" 
| 105 || August 4 || @ Tigers || 6–2 || Springs (4–3) || Hutchison (1–5) || — || 16,595 || 56–49 || W2
|- style="background:#bfb;" 
| 106 || August 5 || @ Tigers || 5–3 || Beeks (2–1) || Jiménez (3–1) || Poche (7) || 21,547 || 57–49 || W3
|- style="background:#fbb;"
| 107 || August 6 || @ Tigers || 1–9 || Hill (2–3) || McClanahan (10–5) || — || 40,101 || 57–50 || L1
|- style="background:#bfb;"
| 108 || August 7 || @ Tigers || 7–0 || Poche (4–1) || Soto (2–6) || — || 18,395 || 58–50 || W1
|- style="background:#fbb;"
| 109 || August 9 || @ Brewers || 3–5 || Peralta (4–2) || Yarbrough (0–7) || Bush (2) || 30,030 || 58–51 || L1
|- style="background:#fbb;"
| 110 || August 10 || @ Brewers || 3–4  || Williams (3–2) || Thompson (3–3) || — || 30,644 || 58–52 || L2
|- style="background:#fbb;" 
| 111 || August 12 || Orioles || 3–10 || Voth (3–1) || Kluber (7–7) || — || 12,380 || 58–53 || L3
|- style="background:#bfb;"
| 112 || August 13 || Orioles || 8–2 || McClanahan (11–5) || Hall (0–1) || — || 16,823 || 59–53 || W1
|- style="background:#bfb;"
| 113 || August 14 || Orioles || 4–1 || Rasmussen (7–4) || Lyles (9–9) || Adam (6) || 18,093 || 60–53 || W2
|- style="background:#bfb;"
| 114 || August 15 || @ Yankees || 4–0 || Yarbrough (1–7) || Cole (9–5) || — || 42,192 || 61–53 || W3
|- style="background:#bfb;"
| 115 || August 16 || @ Yankees || 3–1 || Springs (5–3) || Cortés Jr. (9–4) || Adam (7) || 41,083 || 62–53 || W4
|- style="background:#fbb;"
| 116 || August 17 || @ Yankees || 7–8  || Chapman (2–3) || Beeks (2–2) || — || 42,512 || 62–54 || L1
|- style="background:#bfb;"
| 117 || August 18 || Royals || 7–1 || Patiño (1–1) || Castillo (0–1) || — || 8,169 || 63–54 || W1
|- style="background:#fbb;"
| 118 || August 19 || Royals || 2–3  || Barlow (5–4) || Beeks (2–3) || — || 10,049 || 63–55 || L1
|- style="background:#bfb;"
| 119 || August 20 || Royals || 5–2 || Rasmussen (8–4) || Bubic (2–8) || Fairbanks (3) || 19,800 || 64–55 || W1
|- style="background:#bfb;"
| 120 || August 21 || Royals || 3–2 || Armstrong (2–1) || Cuas (2–2) || Fairbanks (4) || 12,940 || 65–55 || W2
|- style="background:#bfb;"
| 121 || August 22 || Angels || 2–1 || Springs (6–3) || Davidson (2–4) || Armstrong (1) || 9,942 || 66–55 || W3
|- style="background:#bfb;"
| 122 || August 23 || Angels || 11–1 || Kluber (8–7) || Suárez (4–6) || — || 8,810 || 67–55 || W4
|- style="background:#bfb;"
| 123 || August 24 || Angels || 4–3  || Chargois (1–0) || Barría (2–3) || — || 9,763 || 68–55 || W5
|- style="background:#bfb;"
| 124 || August 25 || Angels || 8–3 || Rasmussen (9–4) || Sandoval (4–9) || — || 10,733 || 69–55 || W6
|- style="background:#fbb;"
| 125 || August 26 || @ Red Sox || 8–9 || Wacha (9–1) || Yarbrough (1–8) || Whitlock (6) || 30,095 || 69–56 || L1
|- style="background:#fbb;"
| 126 || August 27 || @ Red Sox || 1–5 || Hill (6–5) || Springs (6–4) || Schreiber (5) || 34,036 || 69–57 || L2
|- style="background:#bfb;"
| 127 || August 28 || @ Red Sox || 12–4 || Kluber (9–7) || Pivetta (9–10) || — || 29,116 || 70–57 || W1
|- style="background:#bfb;"
| 128 || August 30 || @ Marlins || 7–2 || Chargois (2–0) || Luzardo (3–6) || — || 7,386 || 71–57 || W2
|- style="background:#bfb;" 
| 129 || August 31 || @ Marlins || 2–1  || Adam (2–2) || Nance (0–2) || Beeks (2) || 7,420 || 72–57 || W3
|-

|- style="background:#bfb;"
| 130 || September 2 || Yankees || 9–0 || Springs (7–4) || Germán (2–3) || — || 17,886 || 73–57 || W4
|- style="background:#bfb;" 
| 131 || September 3 || Yankees || 2–1 || Kluber (10–7) || Schmidt (5–4) || Adam (8) || 21,754 || 74–57 || W5
|- style="background:#fbb;"
| 132 || September 4 || Yankees || 1–2 || Montas (5–11) || Armstrong (2–2) || Holmes (18) || 25,025 || 74–58 || L1
|- style="background:#bfb;" 
| 133 || September 5 || Red Sox || 4–3 || Faucher (2–3) || Familia (2–2) || Fairbanks (5) || 12,264 || 75–58 || W1
|- style="background:#bfb;" 
| 134 || September 6 || Red Sox || 8–4 || Cleavinger (1–1) || Hill (6–6) || — || 8,069 || 76–58 || W2
|- style="background:#bfb;"
| 135 || September 7 || Red Sox || 1–0 || Chirinos (1–0) || Pivetta (9–11) || Fairbanks (6) || 8,696 || 77–58 || W3
|- style="background:#bfb;" 
| 136 || September 9 || @ Yankees || 4–2 || Rasmussen (10–4) || Montas (5–12) || Armstrong (2) || 46,160 || 78–58 || W4
|- style="background:#fbb;" 
| 137 || September 10 || @ Yankees || 3–10 || Taillon (13–4) || Kluber (10–8) || — || 43,088 || 78–59 || L1
|- style="background:#fbb;"
| 138 || September 11 || @ Yankees || 4–10 || Peralta (3–4) || Patiño (1–2) || — || 36,402 || 78–60 || L2
|- style="background:#fbb;" 
| 139 || September 12 || @ Blue Jays || 2–3 || Mayza (7–0) || Adam (2–3) || Romano (33) || 23,002 || 78–61 || L3
|- style="background:#bfb;" 
| 140 || September 13  || @ Blue Jays || 4–2 || Springs (8–4) || Merryweather (0–3) || Fairbanks (7) || 23,497 || 79–61 || W1
|- style="background:#fbb;" 
| 141 || September 13  || @ Blue Jays || 2–7 || Bass (4–3) || Poche (4–2) || — || 25,103 || 79–62 || L1
|- style="background:#fbb;" 
| 142 || September 14 || @ Blue Jays || 1–5 || Stripling (8–4) || Rasmussen (10–5) || — || 24,282 || 79–63 || L2
|- style="background:#bfb;"
| 143 || September 15 || @ Blue Jays || 11–0 || McClanahan (12–5) || Gausman (12–10) || — || 23,820 || 80–63 || W1
|- style="background:#fbb;" 
| 144 || September 16 || Rangers || 3–4 || Pérez (12–6) || Kluber (10–9) || Leclerc (6) || 14,127 || 80–64 || L1
|- style="background:#bfb;"
| 145 || September 17 || Rangers || 5–1 || Yarbrough (2–8) || Gray (7–7) || — || 14,094 || 81–64 || W1
|- style="background:#bfb;" 
| 146 || September 18 || Rangers || 5–3 || Springs (9–4) || Otto (6–9) || Fairbanks (8) || 12,835 || 82–64 || W2
|- style="background:#fbb;" 
| 147 || September 19 || Astros || 0–4 || García (13–8) || Rasmussen (10–6) || — || 10,390 || 82–65 || L1
|- style="background:#fbb;" 
| 148 || September 20 || Astros || 0–5 || Javier (10–9) || McClanahan (12–6) || Pressly (29) || 8,992 || 82–66 || L2
|- style="background:#fbb;" 
| 149 || September 21 || Astros || 2–5 || McCullers Jr. (4–1) || Raley (1–2) || Pressly (30) || 9,293 || 82–67 || L3
|- style="background:#bfb;" 
| 150 || September 22 || Blue Jays || 10–5 || Yarbrough (3–8) || Berríos (11–6) || — || 8,799 || 83–67 || W1
|- style="background:#bfb;" 
| 151 || September 23 || Blue Jays || 10–6 || Guerra (1–0) || García (4–5) || — || 17,407 || 84–67 || W2
|- style="background:#fbb;" 
| 152 || September 24 || Blue Jays || 1–3 || Manoah (15–7) || Rasmussen (10–7) || Romano (35) || 22,169 || 84–68 || L1
|- style="background:#fbb;" 
| 153 || September 25 || Blue Jays || 1–7 || Stripling (9–4) || McClanahan (12–7) || — || 16,394 || 84–69 || L2
|- style="background:#bfb;" 
| 154 || September 27 || @ Guardians || 6–5  || Guerra (2–0) || Stephan (6–5) || Faucher (1) || 10,775 || 85–69 || W1
|- style="background:#fbb;"
| 155 || September 28 || @ Guardians || 1–2  || Karinchak (2–0) || Guerra (2–1) || — || 10,674 || 85–70 || L1
|- style="background:#fbb;" 
| 156 || September 29 || @ Guardians || 1–2 || De Los Santos (5–0) || Armstrong (2–3) || Stephan (3) || 11,783 || 85–71 || L2
|- style="background:#bfb;" 
| 157 || September 30 || @ Astros || 7–3 || Rasmussen (11–7) || Valdez (16–6) || — || 37,349 || 86–71 || W1
|-

|- style="background:#fbb;"
| 158 || October 1 || @ Astros || 1–2 || Javier (11–9) || McClanahan (12–8) || Pressly (32) || 37,406 || 86–72 || L1
|- style="background:#fbb;"
| 159 || October 2 || @ Astros || 1–3 || García (15–8) || Kluber (10–10) || Montero (14) || 35,809 || 86–73 || L2
|- style="background:#fbb;" 
| 160 || October 3 || @ Red Sox || 3–4 || Schreiber (4–4) || Herget (0–1) || Barnes (7) || 26,633 || 86–74 || L3
|- style="background:#fbb;" 
| 161 || October 4 || @ Red Sox || 0–6  || Eovaldi (6–3) || Springs (9–5) || — || 26,477 || 86–75 || L4
|- style="background:#fbb;" 
| 162 || October 5 || @ Red Sox || 3–6 || Bazardo (1–0) || Fleming (2–5) || Barnes (8) || 26,695 || 86–76 || L5
|-

Postseason

Game Log

|- style="background:#fbb;"
| 1 || October 7 || @ Guardians || 1–2 || Bieber (1–0) || McClanahan (0–1) || Clase (1) || Progressive Field30,741 || 0–1
|- style="background:#fbb;"
| 2 || October 8 || @ Guardians || 0–1  || Hentges (1–0) || Kluber (0–1) || — || Progressive Field34,971 || 0–2
|-

Postseason rosters

| style="text-align:left" |
Pitchers: 18 Shane McClanahan 20 Tyler Glasnow 28 Corey Kluber 29 Pete Fairbanks 30 Brooks Raley 47 Jason Adam 57 Drew Rasmussen 59 Jeffrey Springs 60 Garrett Cleavinger 64 Shawn Armstrong 65 Javy Guerra 68 Jalen Beeks
Catchers: 14 Christian Bethancourt 21 Francisco Mejía 
Infielders: 0 Taylor Walls 2 Yandy Díaz 5 Wander Franco 7 Vidal Bruján 17 Isaac Paredes 26 Ji-man Choi 43 Harold Ramírez 62 Jonathan Aranda 
Outfielders: 6 David Peralta 13 Manuel Margot 22 José Siri 56 Randy Arozarena 
|- valign="top"

Player stats

Batting
Note: G = Games played; AB = At bats; R = Runs scored; H = Hits; 2B = Doubles; 3B = Triples; HR = Home runs; RBI = Runs batted in; AVG = Batting average; SB = Stolen bases

Pitching
Note: W = Wins; L = Losses; ERA = Earned run average; G = Games pitched; GS = Games started; SV = Saves; IP = Innings pitched; H = Hits allowed; R = Runs allowed; ER = Earned runs allowed; BB = Walks allowed; K = Strikeouts

Roster

Farm system

References

External links
Tampa Bay Rays 2022 Schedule at MLB.com
2022 Tampa Bay Rays season at ESPN
2022 Tampa Bay Rays season at Baseball Reference

Tampa Bay Rays season
Tampa Bay Rays
Tampa Bay Rays seasons